Belinda Naa Ode Oku (born October 5, 1970) is a Ghanaian actress popularly known in showbiz as "Adwoa Smart". She was born at Abossey Okai, a suburb of Accra in Ghana. Adwoa has acted in numerous movies and drama episodes over several decades. She was very popular and highly sought after during the heyday of Akan drama from 1980 to the year 2000 and beyond. She has also featured in several music videos. Adwoa came into prominence as a cast member of the long-running Akan drama series "Obra" (Life) which aired on GTV during the 80s and 90s. 

Adwoa started off as a hawker of various consumables through the streets of Accra. Subsequently, she began providing mobile pedicure and manicure services at Kaneshie Market in Accra. Her dancing and acting skills were noticed by a woman called Auntie Rose (Obi Aberewa) who introduced her to Grace Omaboe of "7" fame to refine Adwoa's talents. It was Grace Omaboe who took Adwoa under her wings and supported her during the early days of her career. She also enrolled Adwoa at a popular dancing school to polish her dancing stage performance skills. Grace Omaboe has remained Adwoa's mentor and adopted mother for several decades. The two stayed together for well over 20yrs during the days of Obra, and have remained close friends till this day. In Obra, the two were often cast as mother and daughter. 

In Obra, Adwoa starred alongside the likes of David Dontoh (Ghanaman), Grace Omaboe (Maame Dokono), Joe Eyison (Station Master), Esi Kom, Rev Prince Yawson (Waakye), Charles Amankwaa Ampofo, Jojo Mills Robertson (Yoofi), Richard Kwame Agyeman (Odompo), Lily Ameyaw (Nana Yaa), C.K. Boateng (Kwame Ahe), Charles Adumuah, Emry Brown, Abankwa Duodu, and many others. In latter years when Obra eventually folded, Adwoa joined "Efie Wura" (Landlord), another comic Akan drama series which featured on TV3. Throughout her acting career, Adwoa was often typecast as a child or young girl because of her diminutive stature; she suffers from genetic dwarfism, characterised by a fairly average upper torso with a short lower body and limbs. However, these physical limitations have not diminished her personality and capabilities, both onscreen and in real life. One remarkable attribute of the actress is her bubbly and lively personality. She is extremely mobile and quick on her feet; she always appears smartly dressed with a stylish appearance and a positive demeanour around her.

Adwoa Smart was not able to complete basic school because her classmates teased her about her height and manhandled her because she was comparatively smaller than most of them. One of her lifetime regrets is that she succumbed to the pressure and dropped out of school. Even though she was not able to obtain much formal education, she can still express herself eloquently in English. She has delivered scripted lines in English in some of the films and drama episodes that she has been starred in. In several interviews, she has revealed that she learnt to speak English largely through association with educated family members and friends. Additionally, she speaks Ga and Twi fluently. She acquired the name "Adwoa Smart " from an early age because of her agility, intelligence and quick thinking. Her physical limitations were often used as the subject of humour in films and drama performances.

Early life 
Adwoa Smart was born to Mr and Mrs. Oku at Abossey Okai in Accra. She was raised by her grandmother (the late Cecilia Quaye) with support from her uncle - Dan Oku. Adwoa had a tough childhood because of the social stigma attached to dwarfism and other forms of disability in Ghanaian society. However, her genetic misfortune also turned out to be a blessing when she was noticed by producers and directors in the drama industry. In her social and professional life, Adwoa often tries to lighten the atmosphere by joking about her deformity. This incredible ability to look beyond her own physical disability and maintain a positive perspective about life has won her many friends.

Career 
Adwoa Smart has acted and featured in various movies in the past decades.

Personal life 
Adwoa Smart never married, although she claims to have dated several men in a 2020 interview. When she was about 18 years of age, she met Nana Yaw, a musicians with the popular Obra Soul Train band. The couple had a baby girl but the child sadly died when she was about seven months old. In 1993, she met a gentleman by the name of Alex but the relationship fizzled out due to irreconcilable differences about having children out of wedlock. Adwoa describes herself as a "secondary virgin", given that she has given birth before, although the child did not survive. Photos of a smiling and radiant Adwoa Smart in a wedding dress appeared on social in June 2019. The photos went viral and sparked off speculations that she has wedded in secret. According to Adwoa Smart, she has never bought or owned a car in her life. She aspires to own her own property one day.

Filmography 

 Obra
 Matters of the Heart
 Efiewura
 Yaa Asantewaa
 It's too late
 Father and Son
 Money Bag
 Judgement Day
 Lucifer
 Black Star
 Black Star 2

References

External links

Living people
Ghanaian actresses
1965 births